Peregrinação is a 2017 Portuguese drama film directed by João Botelho. It was selected as the Portuguese entry for the Best Foreign Language Film at the 91st Academy Awards, but it was not nominated.

Cast
Cláudio da Silva as Fernão Mendes Pinto
Jani Zhao as Meng
Catarina Wallenstein as D. Maria Correia de Brito
Rui Morisson as D. Pedro Silva
Filipe Vargas as Fidalgo Espanhol

See also
 List of submissions to the 91st Academy Awards for Best Foreign Language Film
 List of Portuguese submissions for the Academy Award for Best Foreign Language Film

References

External links
 

2017 films
2017 drama films
Portuguese drama films
2010s Portuguese-language films
Films directed by João Botelho